Roberto López Ufarte (born 19 April 1958) is a Spanish former professional footballer who played as a forward.

Nicknamed The little devil, most of his 15-year career was spent at Real Sociedad where he remained 12 seasons, winning four major titles including two La Liga championships. He also represented in the competition Atlético Madrid and Betis, amassing totals of 418 matches and 112 goals.

López Ufarte appeared for Spain at the 1982 World Cup.

Club career
López Ufarte was born in Fes, Morocco. His parents, from Andalusia and Catalonia, moved abroad in search of work, and arrived in Morocco (then part of Spain) in 1944 during the Second World War. They returned to Irun (Basque Country) after about 22 years in Morocco. After making his early footballing efforts at neighbouring Real Unión he signed for Real Sociedad, making his La Liga debut in the 1975–76 season, playing his first game in the competition on 30 November 1975 in a 2–0 derby away loss against Athletic Bilbao aged only 17. From then on he became an essential first-team member, scoring 16 goals in 63 matches in the side's back-to-back league titles.

López Ufarte left the Txuriurdin in 1987, after another solid season: 33 games and ten goals in the league, and the conquest of the Copa del Rey. He scored 129 goals in 474 official appearances during his spell.

After one season with Atlético Madrid (third place), López Ufarte closed his career at Real Betis at the age of 31, after struggling with knee injuries and seeing his team relegate to the Segunda División. He then acted as assistant manager to several coaches at his first professional club, following which he returned to Real Unión as director of football.

International career
López Ufarte won 15 caps for the Spain national team in five years. His debut came on 21 September 1977, scoring in 2–1 friendly win in Switzerland.

López Ufarte appeared for the nation at the 1982 FIFA World Cup which was held on home ground, playing his last match in a 1–2 second group-stage loss against West Germany.

International goals

Honours
Real Sociedad
La Liga: 1980–81, 1981–82
Copa del Rey: 1986–87
Supercopa de España: 1983

See also
List of La Liga players (400+ appearances)
 List of Real Sociedad players 
List of Spain international footballers born outside Spain

References

External links

1958 births
Living people
People from Fez, Morocco
Sportspeople from Irun
Moroccan people of Spanish descent
Spanish people of Catalan descent
Spanish footballers
Footballers from the Basque Country (autonomous community)
Association football forwards
La Liga players
Tercera División players
Real Unión footballers
Real Sociedad B footballers
Real Sociedad footballers
Atlético Madrid footballers
Real Betis players
Spain youth international footballers
Spain under-21 international footballers
Spain international footballers
1982 FIFA World Cup players
Basque Country international footballers
Spanish football managers
Tercera División managers
Real Sociedad B managers
Real Sociedad non-playing staff